Giuseppe Bergomi  (born 22 December 1963) is an Italian former professional footballer who spent his entire career at Inter Milan. He is regarded as one of the greatest Italian defenders of all time, and as one of the best of his generation, being elected by Pelé to be part of the FIFA 100 in 2004.

A one-club man, Bergomi held the record of most appearances for the club for several years, while also being the side's longtime captain. He was affectionately referred to as "Lo zio" ("the uncle") because of his bushy eyebrows and the impressive moustache he wore even as a youngster.

Bergomi works as a pundit at Sky Sports Italia and frequently co-commentates on Serie A matches alongside Fabio Caressa.

Club career
Born in Milan, Bergomi began training with Inter Milan's first team at the age of only 16, and made his professional debut in the 1980–81 season. After winning the Coppa Italia the following year, also reaching the semifinals of the European Cup whilst putting on consistent performances, he soon was part of Italy's senior squad choices.

Bergomi would go on to spend his entire career with Inter, later becoming team captain. The 20 Serie A campaigns in which he competed were often in the shadow of A.C. Milan, as he only won the Scudetto once, during a record-breaking campaign in 1988–89 (he did, however, conquer the UEFA Cup on three occasions, also reaching the final for a fourth time in 1997). For a moment, he held the records for both the most appearances in European competition by an Italian player and the most Milan derbies played, both later broken by Paolo Maldini.

Bergomi retired in 1999 at the age of almost 36, holding the record of most appearances for Inter until late September 2011 when he was overtaken by Javier Zanetti. With 96 appearances, he currently holds the record for most appearances in the UEFA Cup, and in March 2004 he was named by Pelé as one of the top 125 greatest living footballers.

International career
With Italy Bergomi won the 1982 FIFA World Cup. Also, he played in the 1986 and 1990 campaigns (acting as captain in the latter), as well as UEFA Euro 1988, where the nation reached the semi-finals and he was elected part of the team of the tournament. Alongside the likes of Inter's Giuseppe Baresi, his younger brother Franco of A.C. Milan and Juventus F.C. trio of Antonio Cabrini, Claudio Gentile and Gaetano Scirea, he formed the backbone of the national team's defence for much of the 1980s, making his debut on 14 April 1982 in a 0–1 friendly loss in East Germany, aged only 18 years and 3 months, making him the youngest player to feature in a match for Italy post-World War II; in the victorious World Cup run in Spain he appeared in three games, including the full 180 minutes in the last two matches, keeping a clean sheet in the semi-final after coming on for injured Fulvio Collovati.

In the 1986 edition Italy were eliminated in the round-of-16, and Bergomi captained his country in the 1990 tournament – held on home soil – to a third-place finish, playing in all seven matches which included five consecutive wins and as many clean sheets, for a total of 518 minutes without conceding a goal and the best defensive record overall.

After being sent off in a match against Norway for the Euro 1992 qualifiers, Bergomi spent years without being called up to the Azzurri, but was surprisingly selected for the 1998 World Cup at age 34, after playing 28 times in the league and leading the Nerazzurri to the UEFA Cup – his third and last. In France he started off as a reserve, but was substituted in during the last group stage match against Austria when Alessandro Nesta suffered a tournament-ending injury. He partnered for the rest of the tournament with Fabio Cannavaro, Alessandro Costacurta and Maldini, playing three games and leading Italy to a quarter-final finish, where they would be eliminated by hosts and eventual champions France, on penalties; this would be his 81st and final international appearance, to which he added six goals.

Despite playing in four World Cups, Bergomi failed to make one single appearance in the qualifying stages.

Style of play
Bergomi was an extremely versatile defender, who was capable of playing anywhere along the backline and adapting to any formation: although he was primarily a right-back, he was equally capable of playing on the left, as a central defender, or even as a sweeper, positions in which he was often deployed both at club and international level. A quick, athletic, consistent, and hard-working player, who was also strong in the air, in addition to his defensive ability, as a full-back he was also known for his strength, stamina and his ability to make attacking runs up the flank, and was also capable of contributing to his team's offensive plays with goals and assists, courtesy of his good right foot, crossing ability, and powerful shot from outside the area. Above all, however, Bergomi was known for his excellent man-marking skills as a "stopper", although he was later also able to excel in a zonal marking system; he was also highly regarded for his timing of his challenges and his anticipation.

Despite having a strong temper and being a hard tackler − he was sent off 12 times in his career − Bergomi also distinguished himself by his fairness, professionalism, and discipline, which made him well-respected among teammates, opponents, and coaches; he was also regarded for his 'silent leadership' throughout his career. Because of his physical and tenacious playing style, in 2007, The Times placed him at number 9 in their list of the 50 hardest football players in history.

A precocious talent in his youth, Bergomi later also stood out for his longevity throughout his extensive career; indeed, his experience, tactical intelligence, and positional sense, as well as his confidence on the ball, balance, technique, and his ability to play the ball out from the back-line enabled him to excel as a sweeper towards the end of his career, and maintain a high level of performance, in spite of his loss of pace as a result of his physical decline.

Post-playing career
A licensed football coach, Bergomi became youth coach of Esordienti at Inter in 2008. In July 2009 he was appointed youth coach of Allievi Nazionali (under-17) at A.C. Monza Brianza 1912, being promoted as head of the Berretti under-19 team, in co-operation with Giuseppe Chieppa, one year later.

In July 2011, Bergomi left Monza to accept the same position at Atalanta BC. Additionally, he also worked as a football pundit and commentator for Italian satellite television Sky Italia, often commentating with Fabio Caressa, including in Italy's victorious run at the 2006 World Cup.

Personal life
Bergomi is married to Daniela; they have two children: Andrea and Sara.

In May 2020, Bergomi revealed that he had recovered from COVID-19 after contracting it following its outbreak in Italy.

Career statistics

Club

International

Honours
Inter Milan
Serie A: 1988–89
Coppa Italia: 1981–82
Supercoppa Italiana: 1989
UEFA Cup: 1990–91, 1993–94, 1997–98

Italy
FIFA World Cup: 1982; third place: 1990

Individual
UEFA European Championship Team of the Tournament: 1988
Pirata d'Oro (Inter Milan Player of the Year): 1990
Premio Nazionale Carriera Esemplare "Gaetano Scirea": 1997
FIFA 100: 2004
Italian Football Hall of Fame: 2016
Inter Milan Hall of Fame: 2020

Orders
 4th Class / Officer: Ufficiale Ordine al Merito della Repubblica Italiana: 1991

References

External links

 

1963 births
Living people
Footballers from Milan
Italian footballers
Association football defenders
Serie A players
Inter Milan players
Italy international footballers
Italy under-21 international footballers
1982 FIFA World Cup players
1986 FIFA World Cup players
1990 FIFA World Cup players
1998 FIFA World Cup players
UEFA Euro 1988 players
FIFA World Cup-winning players
FIFA 100
UEFA Cup winning players
Officers of the Order of Merit of the Italian Republic